The West of England line (also known as the West of England Main Line) is a British railway line from , Hampshire, to  in Devon, England. Despite its historic title, it is not today's principal route from London to the West of England: Exeter and everywhere further west are reached more quickly from London Paddington via the Reading–Taunton line.

History 
Once all sections had been incorporated into the London and South Western Railway, the sections and branches were:

 Basingstoke to Salisbury
 Basingstoke to Andover, opened 3 July 1854
 Andover to Salisbury, opened 1 May 1857
 Branches:
Basingstoke and Alton Light Railway opened June 1901, closed 30 May 1936
 From Hurstbourne and Andover to Romsey and on to Eastleigh and Southampton: both closed. Link via Longparish opened 1 June 1885; closed 6 July 1931.
 At Andover, junction with the Midland and South Western Junction Railway to Cheltenham
 Bulford Camp branch
 Salisbury to Romsey, with a branch to Bournemouth
 At Salisbury, the Great Western Railway (GWR) line from Westbury and Bristol had its own terminus: the L&SWR continued the route southeast towards Southampton. This route is known nowadays as the Wessex Main Line.
Between Salisbury and Exeter:
 Salisbury to Yeovil, opened 2 May 1859
 Yeovil to Exeter, opened 19 July 1860
 Branches:
 To Yeovil Town (joint station with the GWR)
 To Chard (joint station with the GWR)
 To Lyme Regis from Axminster
 To Seaton from Seaton Junction (closed)
 To Sidmouth from Sidmouth Junction (also alternative route to Exmouth)
 To Exmouth from Exmouth Junction near Exeter

The Beeching Report identified the duplication of routes from London to the West Country, therefore British Rail downgraded the line in 1967 by reducing long sections west of Salisbury to single track. This restricts the number of trains on this section, but passing loops have been added to alleviate this.

Route 
The West of England Line diverges at Worting Junction, a short distance west of Basingstoke.

Network Rail splits the line into two sections: the first section from the line's start at Worting Junction to Wilton Junction (near Salisbury) is classified as "London & SE commuter", while the section from Wilton Junction to Exeter is a "secondary" route. The secondary route west of Salisbury is predominantly single track, but has three sections of double track and four passing loops. The double track sections and passing loops are: a loop just outside Tisbury station, a loop at Gillingham station, double track from Templecombe to Yeovil Junction, a loop at the former Chard Junction station, 3 miles of double track centred on Axminster, a loop at Honiton station, and double track from Pinhoe to Exeter.

The line's speed limit is mainly 80–90 mph over its whole length from Basingstoke to Exeter. Speed is further limited around the junctions. The first section to Wilton Junction has a listed line speed of 50–90 mph, and the secondary section to Exeter has a line speed of mainly 85 mph with parts at 70 mph.

Worting Junction 

When the line was first opened in 1854, Worting Junction was constructed as a flat junction. This required that down trains heading west and up trains from Southampton cross each other's paths.  Initially this was not a great problem, however as traffic and speeds increased the junction became a bottleneck.  To relieve this, a flying junction was provided to the south, opening on 30 May 1897.  This changed the arrangement so that up trains from Southampton line now crossed over the up and down Salisbury lines on Battledown Flyover,  miles west of Basingstoke.

North of Worting Junction, stopping services to/from London Waterloo and CrossCountry services to/from the North of England via Reading use the outer pair of tracks, while express services to/from London Waterloo use the inner pair of tracks. The inner pair of tracks are unelectrified through the junction and continue towards the west to Salisbury and Exeter.

Current operations 
 
Passenger services are operated by South Western Railway using Class 159 and Class 158 trains.

The 2006 Network Rail South West Main Line Route Utilisation Strategy recommended building an extended section of double track from Chard Junction to Axminster, and a passing loop at Whimple. However, Network Rail's 2008 Route Plan was silent on the Whimple loop. The Axminster Loop is centred on Axminster station, and does not extend to Chard Junction as originally proposed. The line between Basingstoke, Salisbury and Exeter is not electrified.

Other lines beyond Exeter 
Beyond Exeter, the line continued to Plymouth via Okehampton and Tavistock as the Exeter to Plymouth railway of the LSWR. This line is now partly closed, with the surviving sections downgraded to branch lines. The section from Exeter to Coleford Junction, near Yeoford, is still in use as part of the Tarka Line (a community railway, which continues to Barnstaple). The Dartmoor line runs from Coleford Junction to Okehampton, having reopened to regular passenger services in late 2021, after being run as a heritage railway from 1997 to 2019. The track is still extant to the former Meldon Quarry railway station to the west, where the track breaks. Tavistock lacks a rail connection, and the final section of the original main line, from Bere Alston, continues to Plymouth as part of the Tamar Valley Line.

See also 

 Exeter to Plymouth railway of the LSWR
 Southern Railway routes west of Salisbury

References

Bibliography

Further reading 
 

Rail transport in Devon
Rail transport in Dorset
Rail transport in Hampshire
Rail transport in Somerset
Rail transport in Wiltshire
Transport in Exeter
Railway lines in South East England
Railway lines in South West England
Standard gauge railways in England